Malezonotus is a genus of dirt-colored seed bugs in the family Rhyparochromidae. There are about nine described species in Malezonotus.

Species
These nine species belong to the genus Malezonotus:
 Malezonotus angustatus (Van Duzee, 1910)
 Malezonotus arcuatus Ashlock, 1958
 Malezonotus barberi Ashlock, 1958
 Malezonotus fuscosus Barber, 1918
 Malezonotus grossus Van Duzee, 1935
 Malezonotus mayorgae Brailovsky & Cervantes, 1989
 Malezonotus obrieni Ashlock, 1963
 Malezonotus rufipes (Stal, 1874)
 Malezonotus sodalicius (Uhler, 1876)

References

Rhyparochromidae
Articles created by Qbugbot